Herman John "Dutch" Kemner (March 4, 1899 – January 16, 1988) was a pitcher in Major League Baseball. He played for the Cincinnati Reds.

References

External links

1899 births
1988 deaths
Major League Baseball pitchers
Cincinnati Reds players
Baseball players from Illinois
Sportspeople from Quincy, Illinois